Janca is one of the eight Natural Regions of Peru (Janq'u is Aymaran for “White”). It is located in the frozen heights where the condor lives.

The fauna in this region is limited because of the very cold weather. The only plant that grows here is the yareta or yarita (Azorella yarita).

Overview 
Andean Continental Divide
 

Mountain Top:

 Mountain passes - 4,100 m   
 Puna grassland  
 Andean-alpine desert  
 Snow line - about 5,000 m  
 Janca - Rocks, Snow and Ice     
 Peak

See also

 Climate zones by altitude
 Altitudinal zonation

Literature 

Andes
Altitudinal life zones of Peru
Ecoregions of Peru
Physiographic regions of Peru